The 1948 United States presidential election in Iowa took place on November 2, 1948, as part of the 1948 United States presidential election. Iowa voters chose ten representatives, or electors, to the Electoral College, who voted for president and vice president.

Iowa was won by incumbent Democratic President Harry S. Truman of neighbouring Missouri, running with Senator Alben W. Barkley, with 50.31% of the popular vote, against Governor Thomas Dewey (R–New York), running with Governor Earl Warren, with 47.58% of the popular vote.

Results

Results by county

See also
 United States presidential elections in Iowa

References

Iowa
1948
1948 Iowa elections